Six ships of the French navy have bourn the name Créole in honour of Creole peoples.

Ships named Créole 
 , a 40-gun frigate
 Créole (1806), a brig that campaigned in the Indian Ocean under Jacques Bergeret
 , a 10-gun brig-sloop
 , a 24-gun corvette
 Créole (1833), a schooner
 , an  that saw action in the Suez Crisis

Notes and references

Notes

References

Bibliography 
 
 
 

French Navy ship names